Gregory Fleet is an Australian comedian and actor.

History

Early life
Fleet was born in Michigan, in the United States. His father moved the family to Australia when Greg was four. He grew up in Geelong, and as a teenager boarded at Geelong Grammar School. Fleet briefly attended Australia's National Institute of Dramatic Art (NIDA), but was kicked out after a year for poor performance.

Career
Fleet began his acting career in the early 1980s with several performances in Australian television series and telemovies. He appeared in Matthew and Son alongside Nicole Kidman in 1984, and then played the role of "Delivery Man 2" in an episode of Prisoner in 1985. Fleet went on to star as Lt Scott Harris in the Australian mini-series A Thousand Skies.

In 1988, after a guest appearance in The Flying Doctors, Fleet took on the role of Dave Summers in the Australian soap Neighbours. His most dramatic sequence in this program involved killing the popular character of Daphne in a car accident. Fleet then appeared in the popular Australian sketch show Full Frontal.

Since then, Fleet has been a regular stand-up comedian around Australia, and has appeared on many TV and radio comedy programs, including The Comedy Channel's Stand Up Australia!. He was the announcer and narrator for the comedy series Real Stories on the Ten Network, and provides the voice of "Sandy" the Yellow Labrador in TV commercials for the Home Hardware hardware store chain.

During 2006 and 2007 Fleet was often heard on Triple M's Get This radio program as a frequent guest co-host alongside Tony Martin, Ed Kavalee, and Richard Marsland. On occasions he filled in as a last-minute replacement guest as he only lived a short distance away from the Triple M studio.

In 2011 Fleet commissioned a DVD containing segments of some of his best known performances. The DVD is sold as Bootlegs and Jumperpants and has been sold for $20 Australian dollars. Fleet has alluded to the funds from this DVD going towards financing his filming of his classic 1995 show Thai Die. This was to be filmed on 7 November 2011 at The Comics Lounge in Melbourne.

In 2015, Fleet starred in the Australian zombie comedy film Me and My Mates vs the Zombie Apocalypse, alongside fellow Australian comedians Jim Jefferies and Alex Williamson.

In 2021, he acted in the play The Twins which opened at the 2021 Adelaide Fringe Festival and won the Mental Health Awareness Award.

Books 
Thai Die (2002)  Random House

These Things Happen (2015) Macmillan 9781743537916

The Good Son (2018) Random House

Personal life

When Fleet was ten his father faked his own death, only to reappear later in his life. His father changed his name, married, and fathered another child during this absence, and then eventually returned to the US. Fleet expanded upon these experiences in his live show I Wish You Were Dead.

Fleet has also fought a long battle with heroin addiction, a subject he has covered in many media interviews, his live show "10 Years in a Long Sleeved Shirt", and on the 1997 ABC television program Smallest Room in the House. In 2015 Fleet also revealed a six-month long addiction with methamphetamine in 2005. In 2007 Fleet went into drug rehab, and returned for the 2 April 2007 episode of Get This. Although Fleet had claimed to be drug-free, in an interview in April 2011 he admitted that he was stoned during that performance.

Fleet is a passionate long-distance supporter of the Hibernian Football Club.

References

External links
 Official Greg Fleet site
 
 Greg Fleet Bio - Token Artists
 Greek Fleet comes clean - ABC Conversations with Richard Fidler

Australian people of American descent
Australian stand-up comedians
Living people
People educated at Geelong Grammar School
Male actors from Geelong
1962 births